The Pearl-class corvettes were a group of ten screw-driven ships built in England from 1855 through 1865. Units of the class saw action in the Crimean War, but they were regarded as mediocre.

History
In 1856 Sir Baldwin Wake Walker submitted a ship design featuring a light deck supporting pivot guns disposed fore and aft.

Ships
 HMS Clio (1858)
 HMS Challenger (1858)
 HMS Charybdis (1859)
 HMS Cadmus (1856)
 HMS Racoon (1857)
 HMS Satellite (1855)
 HMS Scout (1856)
 HMS Scylla (1856)
 HMS Pearl (1855)
 HMS Pelorus (1857)

References

Pearl-class corvettes